Load line may refer to:

 Ship's load line, related to ship construction
 Load line (electronics), a method of determining operating points in circuits with non-linear elements.